Only Fools Rush In is a 2022 road trip comedy-drama film written and directed by Han Han. It was released in China on 1 February 2022 and was received poorly by audiences.

Plot

The film depicts Wu Renteng and Wu Renyao (nicknamed Ah Yao), an estranged father and son, who bond on a motorcycle trip. They are joined by Renyao's friend Zhou Huansong and her brother Zhou Huange.

Cast
 Liu Haoran as Wu Renyao
 Liu Haocun as Zhou Huansong
 Shen Teng as Wu Renteng
 Yin Zheng as Zhou Huange
  as Uncle Zi liang
  as Dong Tu
 Wang Yanlin as Debt collector
 Huang Xiaoming as Showta (special appearance)
  as Hong Chen (special appearance)
 Feng Shaofeng as Officer Li (guest appearance)
 Jordan Chan as Qiu Ge (special appearance)
 Wu Yanshu as Wu Renyao (special appearance)
 Alex Man as Uncle Liu (special appearance)
 Gao Huayang as Ju Xiong
  as Chun Juan (special appearance)

Production

The film's Chinese title Sì Hǎi (四海) literally means "four seas" or "the whole world". An early working title was Niánqīng de Gùshi (年轻的故事), "a young story".

The project was officially launched and gained approval for filming in February 2021. The same month, it was reported that shooting had started. It was filmed on Nan'ao Island and in Guangzhou. Production was finished on 20 August 2021 in Guangzhou.

The film features motorcycle racing scenes and a variety of different motorcycles. The film's director, Han Han, who has experience filming car racing, said that motorcycle scenes are much more difficult to film than car scenes. When filming a car scene, Han said, a drone can get very close to the vehicle to get a good shot, and in the event of a collision the damage to the drone is a tolerable cost, but when filming a motorcycle the filmmakers cannot risk a drone accidentally striking the driver.

Release

Only Fools Rush In was released in mainland China on 1 February 2022 (Chinese New Year) and was shown in IMAX theaters. It was advertised as an uplifting film.

It was released in the United Kingdom on 4 February 2022.

Reception

Box office
The film was highly anticipated, earning $44.48 million CNY in presales- It went on to gross an opening day of $225 million CNY ($33.74 million USD) placing second at the Chinese box office, after The Battle at Lake Changjin II. After receiving negative reviews, the film's daily box office grosses began dropping dramatically, to $62 million CNY ($9.79 million USD) by its third day and $25 million CNY ($3.98 million USD) by its fifth. By the end of the first week of the Chinese New Year holiday, the film had grossed a total of $475 million CNY ($76.3 million USD) ending up sixth place below Sniper. The film continued to drop in popularity and by 12 February had dropped below Dunk for the Future with a daily gross of $5.1 million CNY ($0.81 million USD).

Critical response
Though the film did well in pre-release ticket sales, it was a disappointment upon its release, receiving negative reviews from audiences. It received an average rating of 5.5 out of 10 on Douban and 8.7 out of 10 on Maoyan.

Sun Jiayin of Xinmin Evening News wrote that the film's storyline and themes were very similar to Han Han's previous productions (The Continent, Duckweed, and Pegasus), so much so as to make viewers feel as if they had seen it before.

See also
 Four Seas

Notes

References

External links
 
 
 

2022 films
2022 comedy-drama films
Films about families
Motorcycling films
Chinese comedy-drama films
IMAX films